The R297 road is a regional road in counties Sligo and Mayo, in Ireland.

The government legislation that defines the R297, the Roads Act 1993 (Classification of Regional Roads) Order 2012 (Statutory Instrument 54 of 2012), provides the following official description:

Dromore West, County Sligo — Dooyeaghny, County Mayo

Between its junction with N59 road at Dromore West in the county of Sligo and its junction with N59 road at Dooyeaghny in the county of Mayo via Easky, Rathlee, Kilglass, Cloonaderavally, Inishcrone and Bunnanilra in the county of Sligo.

See also
 List of roads of County Mayo
 National primary road
 National secondary road
 Regional road
 Roads in Ireland

References

Regional roads in the Republic of Ireland
Roads in County Mayo
Roads in County Sligo